Bursachitina is an extinct genus of chitinozoans. It was described by Taugourdeau in 1966.

Species
 Bursachitina bursa (Taugourdeau et de Jekhowsky, 1960)
 Bursachitina conica (Taugourdeau et de Jekhowsky, 1964)
 Bursachitina nana (Nestor, 1994)
 Bursachitina nestorae Mullins et Loydell, 2001
 Bursachitina umbilicata Vandenbroucke, Rickards et Verniers, 2005

References

Prehistoric marine animals
Fossil taxa described in 1966